Clausilia bidentata, the two-toothed door snail, is a species of door snails, terrestrial pulmonate gastropod mollusks in the genus Clausilia belonging to the family Clausiliidae, all of which have a clausilium.

Subspecies
 Clausilia bidentata abietina  Dupuy, 1849 
 Clausilia bidentata bidentata  (Ström, 1765) 
 Clausilia bidentata crenulata  Risso, 1826 
 Clausilia bidentata moniziana  Lowe, 1852

Distribution
This species is present in much of western Europe, including:

 Czech Republic - in Bohemia only
 Great Britain
 Ireland

Habitat
This species is commonly found under bark of trees or in crevices of rocks. 
The snails are often encountered when they are most active, at night during wet weather, at which time they often climb up trees and feed on lichens.

Description
The shell of this snail is a small and cylindrical snail, very high-spired and narrow. The shell length reaches . The shell is dark brown with noticeable spiral ribs, slight longitudinal grooves, and a horny operculum.

Gallery

References

 Anderson, R. 2005, An Annotated List of the Non-Marine Mollusca of Britain and Ireland, Journal of Conchology, London, 38: 607-638
 Kerney, M, 1999, Atlas of the Land and Freshwater Molluscs of Britain and Ireland, Harley Books, Colchester

External links
Clausilia bidentata at Animalbase taxonomy,short description, distribution, biology,status (threats), images 
 Fauna Europaea
 Biolib
 Habitas
 Naturespot

bidendata
Molluscs of Europe
Gastropods described in 1765
Taxa named by Hans Strøm